The South Central Review is an academic journal established in 1984 and the official publication of the South Central Modern Language Association. It is an eclectic, interdisciplinary journal, publishing a wide range of material including literary criticism, philosophy, history, politics, film studies, and debates on cultural topics. The journal often prints special issues focusing on narrower themes. The current editor is Richard J. Golsan (Texas A&M University).

The journal is published three times a year in March, July, and November by the Johns Hopkins University Press. Circulation is 1,000 and the average length of an issue is 160 pages.

External links

South Central Review at Project MUSE

Cultural journals
English-language journals
Johns Hopkins University Press academic journals
Publications established in 1984
Triannual journals